The state and local elections in North Dakota in 2006 proceeded as follows:

State offices

Secretary of State

Incumbent Republican North Dakota Secretary of State Al Jaeger defeated Democratic-NPL nominee Kristin Hedger, an aide to Senator Byron Dorgan.

Attorney General

Popular incumbent Republican Attorney General of North Dakota Wayne Stenehjem defeated Democratic-NPL nominee Bill Brudvick, an attorney.

Agriculture Commissioner

Incumbent Democratic-NPL North Dakota Agriculture Commissioner Roger Johnson defeated 2004 Republican) nominee Doug Goehring in a rematch.

Public Service Commissioner

Incumbent Republican North Dakota Public Service Commissioner Tony Clark defeated Democratic-NPL nominee Cheryl Bergian, a former candidate for the North Dakota State Senate.

Tax Commissioner

Incumbent Republican North Dakota Tax Commissioner Cory Fong defeated Democratic-NPL nominee Brent Edison, the 2004 Democratic-NPL nominee for North Dakota State Auditor.

Ballot measures

Constitutional Measure 1
This ballot measure made proposed changes to policy relating to public school trust funds.

Initiated Constitutional Measure 2
This ballot measure prohibited the use of land taken by eminent domain for any future private use, with exceptions of public utilities and common carriers.

Statutory Measure 3
This ballot measure would have made changes to family law concerning child custody, child support, and other issues.

Legislature Summary
In the North Dakota House of Representatives, the North Dakota Democratic-NPL Party gained six seats, to total 33, while the Republicans hold all of the remaining 61 seats. In the North Dakota Senate, the North Dakota Democratic-NPL Party gained six seats, to total 21, while the Republicans hold all of the remaining 26 seats.

References

See also
United States Senate election in North Dakota, 2006
North Dakota congressional elections, 2006

 
North Dakota